Sokol is a Pan-Slavic physical education movement, with origins in the Czech lands.

Sokol or Sokół (meaning the falcon in Slavic languages) may also refer to:
Sokół, Polish offshoot of the Czech movement

People
Sokol (given name)
Sokol (surname)
Sokół (rapper), Polish rapper

Places
Sokol District, a district in Northern Administrative Okrug of Moscow, Russia
Sokol Urban Settlement, a municipal formation which the town of oblast significance of Sokol in Vologda Oblast, Russia is incorporated as
Sokol, Russia, several inhabited localities in Russia
Sokol (Moscow Metro), a station of the Moscow Metro
Sokol Airport, an airport in Magadan, Russia
Sokol (Lusatian Mountains) a peak on the frontier between Germany and the Czech Republic
Sokoľ, a village in eastern Slovakia
Sokół, Łódź Voivodeship (central Poland)
Sokół, Masovian Voivodeship (east-central Poland)
Sokół, Subcarpathian Voivodeship (south-east Poland)
Socol, a commune bordering Serbia and Romania
Sokol International Racetrack, a racetrack in Kazakhstan

Buildings
D. J. Sokol Arena, a student recreational facility in Omaha, Nebraska
Sokol Auditorium, a building in Omaha, Nebraska, United States
Sokol Blosser Winery, a vineyard, tasting room and winery near Dayton, Oregon
Telocvicna Jednota "T.J." Sokol Hall, an historic building in Crete, Nebraska
Sokol Stadium, sport arena in Antofagasta, Chile

Sports clubs
DHC Sokol Poruba, a Czech women's handball club
FC Sokol Saratov a Russian football club
Sokol Cholupice a Czech football club
Sokół Nisko, a Polish football club
Sokol Novocheboksarsk, an ice hockey team in Russia
TJ Sokol Dolná Ždaňa, a Slovak football team
TJ Sokol Mariánské Hory, a Czech rugby club
TJ Sokol Ovčáry, a football club in the Czech Republic
TJ Sokol Protivanov, a Czech football club
TJ Sokol Tasovice, a Czech football club
TJ Sokol Živanice, a football club in the Czech Republic
Club Deportivo Sokol, a sports institution of Punta Arenas, Chile

Transport, technology, and military
Orličan L-40 Meta Sokol, a Czechoslovakian sports and touring aircraft
Sokol (camera), a Soviet photo camera brand
ORP Sokół, name of three submarines of the Polish Navy
PZL W-3 Sokół, a Polish helicopter
Sokol design bureau, a Soviet aerospace company
Sokol Eshelon, a Russian laser based anti-satellite system
Sokół motorcycles, a brand of motorcycles, produced in Poland before World War II
Sokół 1000, a Polish pre-war motorcycle
Sokol space suit, used in the Soviet space program
Sokol (train), a stopped high speed Russian train project
, a Yugoslav cargo ship

Music
Sokol (Soviet band), 1960s Soviet rock group
"The Falcon" (Russian сокол), Russian song :ru:Re:Аквариум
"Sokol" (Nadezhda Misyakova song), the Belarusian song in the Junior Eurovision Song Contest 2014, sung by Nadezhda Misyakova

See also
Szokol (surname)
Socol
Sokil (disambiguation)
Sokal (disambiguation)
Sokolac (disambiguation)